Gramsh District was one of the  was one of the 36 districts of Albania, which were dissolved in July 2000 and replaced by 12 counties. It is in the centre of the country, and its capital was the town of Gramsh.

Administrative divisions
The district consisted of the following municipalities:
Gramsh
Kodovjat
Kukur
Kushovë
Lënie
Pishaj
Poroçan
Skënderbegas
Sult
Tunjë

References

Districts of Albania
Geography of Elbasan County